Polish Committee for Standardization is a Polish governmental organization responsible for standardization.

It was established in 1924.

Polish Standard 
Polish Standard (denoted by the symbol BS) - a nationwide standard, adopted by consensus and approved by the Polish Committee for Standardization, The Polish Standards are widely available but not free, and their distribution is controlled by the PKN.

See also

 PN-83/P-55366
 Poland
 Typography

External links
 Polish Committee for Standardization

Organizations established in 1924
Government agencies of Poland